The 1997 Miami tornado (also known as the Great Miami Tornado) was an F1 tornado which touched down in Miami, Florida, on May 12, 1997. It is remembered not for its minor damage, but for its haunting pictures which became the subject of worldwide press attention. The tornado was captured by an elevated camera operated by the local television station WPLG.

The tornado formed at 1:53 p.m. EDT, initially touching down in the Silver Bluff Estates area. It then swept through Downtown Miami bypassing the city's skyscrapers. It crossed the MacArthur Causeway and the Venetian Causeway towards Miami Beach, sideswiping the cruise ship MS Sovereign of the Seas. The tornado lifted from the water halfway through Biscayne Bay and touched down briefly again in Miami Beach, flipping over a car and then dissipating. The Storm Prediction Center in Oklahoma had noted the possibility for tornadoes in the area and warned that there might be more to come. The tornado ultimately caused 12 injuries and $525,000 in damage, though no injuries were serious. The tornado's passage also cut power to 21,000 people.

While hurricanes are often seen as the biggest weather threat to Miami, tornadoes are relatively common in South Florida, although the vast majority of the ones that strike Miami-Dade County are small, relatively weak F0 or F1 tornadoes. Most of these tornadoes form as either waterspouts off Biscayne Bay, as part of the frequent afternoon thunderstorms, or spawned from a tropical storm or hurricane. Tornadoes can and have occurred in every month of the year in Miami-Dade County.

See also
List of North American tornadoes and tornado outbreaks
Tornadoes of 1997

References

F0 and F1 tornadoes
Tornadoes of 1997
Tornadoes in Florida
1997 in Florida
May 1997 events in the United States